Utopiec (plural Utopce), Vodník or Topnik is a name applied to Slavic spirits of water. The utopce are spirits of human souls that died drowning, residing in the element of their own demise. They are responsible for sucking people into swamps and lakes as well as killing the animals standing near the still waters.

One of the examples of the Utopiec in Polish popular culture is the comic book series Lil and Put, where the two titular characters are constantly at odds with an Utopiec living in a pond next to their village. He is never directly seen and possesses magical powers.

Utopiec is the official Polish translation of the Drowned, a monster and hostile entity from the video game Minecraft.

See also 
 Vodyanoy
 Rusalka
 Kelpie
 Kappa

Slavic legendary creatures

Water spirits